Večer is a daily newspaper in North Macedonia. The first issue of Večer was published on 11 November 1963 by NIP Nova Makedonija. Its current managing editor is Vesna Mikik Bozinovska and deputy manager is Elizabeta Arsoska. It is published every day, except Sunday.

External links
 Večer official site

Newspapers published in North Macedonia
Newspapers published in Yugoslavia
Macedonian-language newspapers
Newspapers established in 1963